Hard Groove is an album by the American musician Roy Hargrove, released in 2003. It was credited to his group, the RH Factor.

The album peaked at No. 185 on the Billboard 200. "I'll Stay" was nominated for a Grammy Award, in the "Best R&B Performance By a Duo or Group with Vocals" category.

Production
Produced by Hargrove, the album was recorded at Electric Lady Studios. Hargrove used a 10-piece band on the album. He considered it to be a tribute to his childhood love of hip hop; he also wanted to impart a gospel or spiritual element to the music. Reggie Washington and Pino Palladino were among the musicians on the album.

D'Angelo appears on the cover of Funkadelic's "I'll Stay". Renee Neufville sang on "Juicy". Q-Tip rapped on "Poetry"; Meshell Ndegeocello and Erykah Badu also appeared on the track. Anthony Hamilton sang on "Kwah/Home".

The album cover was designed by Rudy Gutierrez, who was inspired by the art for Abraxas.

Critical reception 

The Boston Globe deemed Hard Groove a "genre-busting album [that] is a funky showcase of Hargrove's musical alacrity." The New York Times labeled it "a late-night party album: it begins upbeat then settles into a stoned haze." The Birmingham Post concluded that "there's a 1970's retro feel which conjures up Donald Byrd's hits, as well as some funk worthy of George Clinton, but it's also very up-to-date, especially in the sophistication of the studio sound."

The Washington Post wrote: "Loose-limbed and groove-driven, it occasionally sounds overplayed and undercomposed as the musicians struggle to find the right balance of rhythmic momentum and jazz improvisation." The New York Amsterdam News stated that Hargrove "plays on the edge of his imagination using jazz improvisations as the key to display another exciting element of his creativity."

AllMusic called the album "an exploration of his multidimensional musical attributes and his belated recognition of years of 'open-eared moonlighting'." The Penguin Guide to Jazz Recordings determined that "Pastor 'T'" "might be one of Hargrove's best performances on record."

Track listing

References 

Roy Hargrove albums
2003 albums
Verve Records albums